Saint Meinrad is a census-designated place (CDP) in Harrison Township, Spencer County, Indiana, United States.  Located along the Anderson River, it is home to the St. Meinrad Archabbey. Interstate 64 runs near the CDP, and it is situated about 55 miles east of Evansville. Because of the archabbey, St. Meinrad, along with Harrison Township, is assigned to  the Archdiocese of Indianapolis. The rest of Spencer County is within the borders of the much closer Diocese of Evansville.

History
Saint Meinrad was laid out in 1861, and named after the local St. Meinrad Archabbey. A post office has been in operation at Saint Meinrad since 1862.

Geography
St. Meinrad is located at geographical coordinates 38° 10′ 19″ North, 86° 48′ 34″ West (38.172039, -86.809464).

Demographics

References

External links
 Saint Meinrad Archabbey

Census-designated places in Spencer County, Indiana
1861 establishments in Indiana